Alec Doomadgee is an Australian actor, television host and presenter. He is also an Indigenous Australian community leader, mentor and activist.

Background
Born and raised on the  born and raised with his extended family on the Waanyi / Garawa Land Trust, he is from the Doomadgee community in the Gulf of Carpentaria. He is also a descendant of Waanyi, Garawa and Gangalidda tribes. Involved in Native Title issues, he is also chairman for the Waanyi PBC.

Film and television
In 2008, he appeared in the short film, Joonba then later  Benjamin Sniddlegrass and the Cauldron of Penguins. He also played the role of Wesley, Grace's husband in episode 1. of Redfern Now. He also made another appearance in the series in episode "Starting Over", this time as Koorioke Announcer. He also had recurring roles as Darana in the 2017 series, Cleverman.

Doomadgee was the driving force behind the acclaimed 2016 documentary, Zach's Ceremony which took ten years to make. It covered his son's initiation into tribal lore. Doomadgee both directed and produced the film which was shown at New York's Margaret Mead Film Festival. He received a Best Documentary Award for the film at the 2016 Byron Bay Film Festival.

Qantas boomerang incident
In 2015, he was stopped by security at Brisbane Airport when he tried to take his boomerangs onto a flight. The reason given, as he was told later, they were considered to be weapons. He told staff that they were not weapons, they were spiritual items. In spite of that he was still not allowed to take them on. He did later get an apology from a Qantas spokeswoman.

Filmography

References

Links
 Imdb

Living people
21st-century Australian male actors
AACTA Award winners
Australian male film actors
Australian male television actors
Australian television presenters
Indigenous Australian male actors
Year of birth missing (living people)